Shwe Phoo Sar Sone Yar Myay is a Burmese drama television series. It aired on MRTV-4, from December 26, 2018 to February 11, 2019, on Mondays to Fridays at 19:00 for 33 episodes.

Cast
Chue Lay as Cho Cho Chit
Kyaw Hsu as San Min Aung
Phone Sett Thwin as Min Thukha
May Thinzar Oo as Daw Sein Chit
Zin Cho Khine Oo as Thuzar
Yan Aung as U Lin Aung
Khine Hnin Wai as Daw Yuzana
Phu Sone as Daw Thet Htar Khin
Thun Thitsar Zaw as Thet Htar Shwe Sin
La Pyae as Paing Thu Aung

References

Burmese television series
MRTV (TV network) original programming